The 1961 Arizona Wildcats football team represented the University of Arizona as an independent during the 1961 NCAA University Division football season.  In their third season under head coach Jim LaRue, the Wildcats compiled an 8–1–1 record, were ranked No. 17 in the final AP Poll, and outscored their opponents, 288 to 131.  The team captains were Bob Garis and Eddie Wilson. The team played its home games in Arizona Stadium in Tucson, Arizona.

The team's statistical leaders included Eddie Wilson with 1,294 passing yards and Bobby Thompson with 752 rushing yards and 468 receiving yards.

Arizona joined the newly formed Western Athletic Conference in 1962.

Until 1979, this season was the last in which the Wildcats defeated Arizona State on the road. Also, Arizona went undefeated at home in the season (not including tie games). This feat would not happen again until 1993. In addition, this season was the only one in which Arizona played Idaho on the road. Prior to that and ever since, all Arizona-Idaho games have been played in Tucson.

Schedule

References

1961 NCAA University Division independents football season
Arizona Wildcats football seasons
Arizona Wildcats football